Ian Francis Jorgensen (also known as Blink) is a Wellington-based events manager, editor and photographer. He is the producer of the New Zealand music compilation and magazine series A Low Hum.

Blink was also the principal photographer for the book, NZ Rock: 1987–2007, written by Gareth Shute, published in 2008.

Since 2007 Ian has been running a music festival called Camp A Low Hum.

Despite overwhelmingly receptive responses to his monthly 2006 music tours around New Zealand, Jorgensen halted the monthly tours in 2007 to pursue new projects. These new projects include a music camp, a touring poster-art collection, the release of a New Zealand-orientated touring hand-book called Local Knowledge.

In mid 2012, Ian (as "Blink") wrote and published another touring hand-book, this time for bands traveling internationally called "D.I.Y Touring the World"

In October 2012, Ian opened a new music venue in Wellington called "Puppies".

In November 2013, Ian launches a new music festival, Square Wave Festival taking place throughout New Zealand.

References

External links
Square Wave official site
Ian Jorgensen's Photography website
Ian Jorgensen's Record label website
 A LOW HUM website
 CAMP A LOW HUM website
 Puppies Bar website
 Interview with Blink
 Camp ALH '09 and interview with Blink on TV3's Nightline
 Review of Camp ALH '09
 Review of DIY Touring the World
 Review of DIY Touring the World
 Review of DIY Touring the World
 Puppies "New venue to change the music scene"
 "In praise of Puppies"

1978 births
Living people
New Zealand photographers
New Zealand columnists